Lothair is an unincorporated community in Liberty County, Montana, United States. The community had a post office until December 17, 2005; it still has its own ZIP code, 59461.

Originally a station on the Great Northern Railway, Lothair became a town in 1910.

References

Unincorporated communities in Liberty County, Montana
Unincorporated communities in Montana